Milford railway station was on the Castleblayney, Keady and Armagh Railway in Northern Ireland.

The Castleblayney, Keady and Armagh Railway opened the station on 1 October 1909.

It closed on 1 February 1932.

Routes

References

Disused railway stations in County Armagh
Railway stations opened in 1909
Railway stations closed in 1932
Railway stations in Northern Ireland opened in the 20th century